Damals in Paris is an East German film directed by Carl Balhaus. It was released in 1956.

Cast
 Gisela Trowe as Geneviève
 Richard Lauffen as Padet
 Günther Simon as Georges
 Hans Stetter as Denis
 Susanne Düllmann as Louise
 Will van Deeg as Krecher
 Hans Fiebrandt as Krügel
 Waldemar Jacobi as Boulin
 Friedrich Teitge as Mann im Hut
 Fritz Decho as Gaston
 Wolfgang Kieling as René
 Herwart Grosse as Madou
 Horst Giese as Robert

External links
 

1956 films
East German films
1950s German-language films
German black-and-white films
Films directed by Carl Balhaus
Films set in Paris
Films about the French Resistance
1950s German films